The 2022 Siberian wildfires are a series of ongoing wildfires in Siberia, Russia that began in Siberia in early May 2022. Fires are concentrated in the Krasnoyarsk, Altai, Irkutsk, Kemerovo, Omsk, Kurgan regions, Khakassia and Sakha republics. The total area of fires, as of 15 May, is about 20 thousand hectares, and since the beginning of 2022 – more than 100 thousand hectares.

Overview 
Possible causes of fires are careless handling of fire during picnics on May holidays, short circuits of power lines and substations or fires of dry grass. Three employees of the power distributor Krasnoyarskenergo has been arrested and charged with manslaughter.

As of 11 May, 1,298 buildings in 60 settlements burned down, including 200 homes, at least 13 people died, including one child. In the city of Krasnoyarsk, the authorities had found that the fine particle concentrations in the air has exceeded levels considered hazardous to human health due to the smoke from wildfires. An Omsk civil association account stated on Twitter that the governor of the region is busy holding pro-Putin festivals and there is no clear action from the regional Emergency Situations Ministry.

President of Russia Vladimir Putin urged authorities to take stronger actions to prevent further spread of wildfire. It is argued that they are uncontrolled due to resources diverted for the 2022 Russian invasion of Ukraine. Smoke from the wildfires reached the western United States and worsened air quality on the coast of California.

See also 
 2022 Russian mystery fires
 2022 Western Russia attacks

References 

2022 wildfires
Wildfires in Russia
2022 disasters in Russia
May 2022 events in Russia
Natural disasters in Siberia